is a Japanese actor represented by Tom company. His father is actor Kazuo Kitamura and his wife is actress Shiho Takano.

Biography
While in Tokyo Metropolitan Institute Fuji High School, Kitamura was interested in theater and wants to be an aspiring actor. He later studied acting at the Japan Institute of the Moving Image and in 1998 he debuted in the stage play Spring Awakening and the film Dr. Akagi. Kitamura perform at stage shows but he does not belong to a specific theater company and in recent years he appeared in a number of television dramas. On 2016 his first starring film role was Taiyō no Futa.

On June 4, 2013, Kitamura married actress Shiho Takano after dating for four years. He later announced in his blog that they later gave birth to male child on November 2014.

Filmography

Film

TV series

Variety shows

Awards

References

External links
Official profile 

 Yukiya Kitamura at Wikiinformer

1974 births
Living people
Male actors from Tokyo